The 1986 season was Molde's 12th season in the top flight of Norwegian football. This season Molde competed in 1. divisjon (first tier) and the Norwegian Cup.

In the league, Molde finished in 9th position, 13 points behind winners Lillestrøm.

Molde participated in the 1986 Norwegian Cup. They reached the Third Round where they lost 0–2 away against Hødd and were eliminated from the competition.

Squad
Source:

Friendlies

Competitions

1. divisjon

Results summary 

Source:

Positions by round

Results

League table

Norwegian Cup

Squad statistics

Appearances and goals
Lacking information:
Appearance statistics from Norwegian Cup rounds 1–3 (7–9 players in rounds 1–2 and 11–13 players in round 3) and one goalscorer from round 1 are missing.

 

 

|}

Goalscorers

See also
Molde FK seasons

References

External links
nifs.no

1986
Molde